Tipsy may refer to:

 Tipsy, an adjective describing a state of light alcohol intoxication
 Tipsy (aircraft), a series of light aircraft designed by Ernest Oscar Tips
 Tipsy (band), an American experimental lounge band

Songs
 "Tipsy" (song), by J-Kwon, 2004
 "Tipsy", by Carmouflage Rose, 2021
 "Tipsy", by Chloe x Halle from the 2020 album Ungodly Hour
 "Tipsy (In Dis Club)", by Pretty Ricky from the 2009 album Pretty Ricky
 "Tipsy", by T-Pain from the 2007 album Epiphany

See also
 Drunk (disambiguation)